Bedison is an unincorporated community in Nodaway County, in the U.S. state of Missouri.

History
A post office called Bedison was established in 1889, and remained in operation until 1942. It is unknown why the name "Bedison" was applied to this community.

References

Unincorporated communities in Nodaway County, Missouri
Unincorporated communities in Missouri